Vedda is an endangered language that is used by the indigenous Vedda people of Sri Lanka. Additionally, communities such as Coast Veddas and Anuradhapura Veddas who do not strictly identify as Veddas also use words from the Vedda language in part for communication during hunting and/or for religious chants, throughout the island.

When a systematic field study was conducted in 1959, the language was confined to the older generation of Veddas from Dambana. In the 1990s, self-identifying Veddas knew few words and phrases in Vedda, but there were individuals who knew the language comprehensively. Initially there was considerable debate amongst linguists as to whether Vedda is a dialect of Sinhalese or an independent language. Later studies indicate that the language spoken by today's Veddas is a creole which evolved from ancient times, when the Veddas came into contact with the early Sinhalese, from whom they increasingly borrowed words and synthetic features, yielding the cumulative effect that Vedda resembles Sinhalese in many particulars, but its grammatical core remains intact.

The parent Vedda language(s) is of unknown linguistic origins, while Sinhalese is part of the Indo-Aryan branch of the Indo-European language family. Phonologically, Vedda is distinguished from Sinhalese by the higher frequency of palatal sounds [c] and [ɟ]. The effect is also heightened by the addition of inanimate suffixes. Morphologically, the Vedda word classes are nouns, verbs and invariables, with unique gender distinctions in animate nouns. It has reduced and simplified many forms of Sinhalese such as second person pronouns and denotations of negative meanings. Instead of borrowing new words from Sinhalese or other languages, Vedda creates combinations of words from a limited lexical stock. Vedda maintains many archaic Sinhalese terms from the 10th to 12th centuries, as a relict of its close contact with Sinhalese, while retaining a number of unique words that cannot be derived from Sinhalese. Vedda has exerted a substratum influence in the formation of Sinhalese. This is evident by the presence of both lexical and structural elements in Sinhalese which cannot be traced to either Indo-Aryan or neighboring Dravidian languages.

History

It is unknown which languages were spoken in Sri Lanka before it was settled by Prakrit-speaking immigrants in the 5th century BCE. The term Vedda is a Dravidian word and stems from the Tamil word  meaning 'hunting'. Cognate terms (such as bedar, beda in Kannada) are used throughout South India to describe hunter-gatherers. Sri Lanka has had other hunter-gathering peoples such as the Rodiya and Kinnaraya.

The earliest account of Vedda was written by Ryklof Van Goens (1663–1675), who served as a Director General of the Dutch East India Company in Sri Lanka. He wrote that the Veddas' language was much closer to Sinhalese than to Tamil. Robert Knox, an Englishman held captive by a Kandyan king, wrote in 1681 that the wild and settled Veddas spoke the language of the Sinhalese people. The Portuguese friar Fernão de Queiroz, who wrote a nuanced description of Vedda in 1686, reported that the language was not mutually intelligible with other native languages.  Robert Percival wrote in 1803 that the Veddas, although seemingly speaking a broken dialect of Sinhalese, amongst themselves spoke a language that was known only to them. But John Davies in 1831 wrote that the Veddas spoke a language that was understood by the Sinhalese except for a few words. These discrepancies in observations were clarified by Charles Pridham, who wrote in 1848 that the Veddas knew a form of Sinhalese that they were able to use in talking to outsiders, but to themselves they spoke in a language that, although influenced by Sinhalese and Tamil, was understood only by them.

The first systematic attempt at studying the Vedda language was undertaken by Hugh Neville, an English civil servant in British Ceylon. He founded The Taprobanian, a quarterly journal devoted to the study of everything Ceylonese. He speculated, based on etymological studies, that Vedda is based on an Old Sinhalese form called Hela.  His views were followed by Henry Parker, another English civil servant and the author of Ancient Ceylon (1909), who wrote that most Vedda words were borrowed from Sinhalese, but he also noted words of unique origin, which he assigned to the original language of the Veddas. The second most important study was made in 1935 by Wilhem Geiger, who also sounded the alarm that Vedda would be soon extinct and needed to be studied in detail. One of the linguists to heed that call was Manniku W. Sugathapala De Silva who did a comprehensive study of the language in 1959 as a PhD thesis, which he published as a book: according to him, the language was restricted to the older generation of people from the Dambana region, with the younger generation shifting to Sinhalese, whereas Coast Veddas were speaking a dialect of Sri Lankan Tamil that is used in the region. During religious festivals, people who enter a trance or spirit possession sometimes use a mixed language that contains words from Vedda. Veddas of the Anuradhapura region speak in Sinhalese, but use Vedda words to denote animals during hunting trips.

Classification

Dialect, creole or independent language
The Vedda community or the indigenous population of Sri Lanka is said to have inhabited the island prior to the arrival of the Aryans in the 5th century B.C. and after the collapse of the dry zone civilization in the 15th century, they have extended their settlements once more in the North Central, Uva and Eastern regions. However, with the entering of the colonization schemes to the island after the 19th century, the Vedda population has shrunk to the Vedi rata or Maha vedi rata. Subsequently, the Vedda language was subjected to hybridisation depending on the geographical locality of the community. For instance, the language of the Veddas living in the North Central and Uva regions was affected by Sinhala, while the language of the coastal Veddas in the East was influenced by the Tamil language. However, there are still many arguments regarding the origin of the Vedda Language. Ariesen Ahubudu calls the Vedda language a "dialect of Sinhala", saying that it is a creole language variety derived from Sinhala. According to him, "Veddas belong to the post Vijayan period and they use a language which has its origins in the Sinhala language." This became , meaning 'those who live in the forest', which later transformed into .

Creole based on Sinhalese
The language contact that might have occurred between the Aryan immigrants and the aboriginal inhabitants could have led either to a language shift or to the crystallization of a new language through the creation of a pidgin. The first instance could have been in effect in relation to the members of the Vedda community who were absorbed  into the new settlements, while in the second instance the occasional contact of the Veddas with the new settlers would have resulted in the crystallization of a new language instead of the original Vedda language.  The term creole refers to a linguistic medium which has crystallized in a situation of language contact and the process of this crystallization begins as a pidgin. A pidgin is spoken natively by an entire speech community, whose ancestors have been geographically displaced through which a rupture is created in their relationship with their original language. Such situations were often the consequences of slavery and trade that occurred from the 17th to the 19th centuries owing to the process of colonization. As far as the Vedda community is concerned, although the features of a creole are visible in terms of phonology, morphology, syntax and lexicon, a number of distinctions have been identified between the Vedda language and the classic creolization which occurred during the colonial period. Here it is also important to acknowledge the existence of many issues in relation to the process of creolization that remain unresolved in the domain of linguistics. Therefore, the classification of the Vedda language either as a dialect or as a creole becomes a difficult task, although it is clear that in the current context the Vedda language is not an independent language of its own.  However based on recent studies conducted on the Vedda community, it has been revealed that the Vedda language is on the verge of facing extinction since the younger generation is keen on using Sinhala or Tamil as their first language, being influenced by the dominant language of the region of residence due to an array of reasons including fragmentation of settlements, economic policies, national education structure and political factors of the country.

Grammar
 In Sinhalese, indicative sentences are negated by adding a negative particle to the emphatic form of the verb, whereas in Vedda, the negative particle is added to the infinitive. In Sinhalese, all indicative sentences whether negative or affirmative, exhibit two tenses – past and non past, but in Vedda a three-term tense system is used in affirmative sentences, but not in negative. Sinhalese pronouns have number distinction, but Vedda does not have number distinction. The Vedda verbal and nominal inflexions are similar to Sinhalese but are not identical. Vedda also exhibits a gender classification in inanimate and animate nouns.

Phonology

Although in phonemic inventory Vedda is very similar to Sinhalese, in phonotactics it is very dissimilar to Sinhalese. The usage of palatal plosives ([c] and [ɟ]) is very high in Vedda. Some comparisons:

These suffixes are used in tandem with borrowings from Sinhalese.

These transformations are very similar to what is seen in other Creole languages like Melanesian Pidgin English and Jamaican English Creole. The preponderance of the palatal affricates is explained as a remainder from days when the original Vedda language had a high frequency of such phonemes.

Morphology
Formerly distinct Vedda nouns have two types of suffixes, one for animate and another for inanimate.

Animate nouns
Examples are
 ('god')
 ('worm')
 ('I' or 'we')
 ('sun')
 ('fire')

These suffixes are also used in singular and plural forms based on the verbal and non-verbal context.

 ('Sir, I killed the elephant though')
 ('When our great-grandmother was walking in the forest there was a child conceived in that one's womb.')

The dependence on verbal (and non-verbal) context for semantic specification, which is accomplished by inflectional devices by natural languages is an indication of a contact language.

Certain words that appear to be from original Vedda language do not have these suffixes; also, animate nouns also have gender distinctions, with small animals treated as feminine (i marker) and larger ones masculine (a marker).
 ('elephant')
 ('deer')
 ('bear')
 ('bear')
 ('buffalo')
 ('bee')
 ('monitor lizard')
 ('bee')
 ('spider')
 ('louse')

Inanimate nouns
Suffixes are used when the words are borrowed from Sinhalese.
 ('eye')
 ('throat')
 ('street')
 ('coconut')
 ('verse')
 ('fire')

There are number of forms that are from the original Vedda language that lack suffixes such as
 ('axe')
 ('pot')
 ('bush')

Pronouns
Compared to Sinhalese, which requires five forms to address people based on status, Vedda uses one irrespective of status. These pronouns are also used in both singular and plural denotations.

Numerals
These are found in definite and indefinite forms, for example  'one' (def.) and  'once' (indef.) Vedda also reduces the number formations found in Sinhalese.

Negation
Another example of simplification in Vedda is the minimisation of negative meanings found in Sinhalese:

Lexicon
Many Vedda words are directly borrowed from Sinhalese or Tamil via Sinhalese while maintaining words that are not derivable from Sinhalese or its cognate languages from the Indo-Aryan language group. Vedda also exhibits a propensity for paraphrases and it coins words from its limited lexical stock rather than borrowing words from other languages including Sinhalese. For example:

Archaic terms
Vedda maintains in its lexicon archaic Sinhalese words that are no longer in daily usage. These archaic words are attested from classical Sinhalese prose from the 10th century until the 13th century, the purported period of close contact between the original Vedda language(s) and Old Sinhala leading to the development of the creole. Some examples are
 in Vedda means 'sky', but in a 10th-century Sinhalese exegetical work called , it is used in the meaning of 'cloud'.
 in Vedda meaning 'fish' is similar to  found in a 10th-century monastic work called Sikhavalanda.
 in Vedda means 'near' or 'with'. This word is attested in the 12th-century eulogy called Butsarana.
 meaning 'wearing apparel' is similar to the Sinhalese word  found in the 13th century work Ummagga Jatakaya; alternatively  in Tamil is a 'loincloth', a cloth worn by early Veddas.
According to research at the turn of the 20th century by British anthropologists Charles and Brenda Seligman, the use of archaic Sinhalese words in Vedda may have arisen from the need to communicate freely in the presence of Sinhalese speakers without being understood. They claimed that this need encouraged the development of a code internal to the Vedda language that included archaic Sinhalese words (as well as mispronounced and invented words) in order to intentionally obfuscate meaning.

Substratum influence in Sinhalese and contemporary situation
These features place Vedda language as an independent body of language, than a creole variety of Sinhala. Now the Vedda language is fast mingling with Sinhala/Tamil according to the respective neighboring contexts. 'From the Southern Sinhala speaking areas Vedda language gets the Sinhala influence, while from the Northern areas it gets the Tamil influence'. According to Prof. Premakumara De Silva and Asitha G. Punchihewa of the University of Colombo, 'the original language of the Veddas has now become a second language mostly commercialized as a tourist attraction, than a cultural asset'. Their functioning language has become Sinhala/Tamil and those who speak the traditional language now are mostly the older generation. The second generation and the youth are more prone to use Sinhala. There are even those who have very little to no knowledge of the Vedda language. Their language has been a cultural identity of the community for a long time. But now, as the Veddas, especially when the second and third generations mix with the locales, Sinhala/Tamil is the language they choose to communicate. With the use of technology, and as the youth pursue educational facilities more and more, Vedda language gets reduced to the level of an exhibit. A visit to the Dambana Vedda Village will prove how the overall culture of Veddas (i.e. their dresses, equipment, etc.) has changed, and how this is reflected in the language as well.

According to Geiger and Gair, Sinhalese language has features that set it apart from other Indo-Aryan languages. Some of the differences can be explained by the substrate influence of parent stock of the Vedda language. Sinhalese has many words that are only found in Sinhalese or it is shared between Sinhalese and Vedda and cannot be etymologically derived from Middle or Old Indo-Aryan. The author of the oldest Sinhalese grammar, Sidatsangarava, written in the 13th century has recognized a category of words that exclusively belonged to early Sinhalese.

See also
Vedda
Balangoda Man
Fa Hien Cave
Indo-Portuguese creole
Ceylon Portuguese creole
Lists of endangered languages
List of endangered languages in Asia

Notes

References

Cited literature

Definitely endangered languages
Languages of Sri Lanka
Mixed languages
Pidgins and creoles
Sinhala language
Language